The following lists events that happened during 1910 in Australia.

Incumbents

Monarch – Edward VII (until 6 May), then George V
Governor-General – William Ward, 2nd Earl of Dudley
Prime Minister – Alfred Deakin (until 29 April), then Andrew Fisher
Chief Justice – Samuel Griffith

State premiers
Premier of New South Wales – Charles Wade (until 1 October), then James McGowen
Premier of South Australia – Archibald Peake (until 3 June), then John Verran
Premier of Queensland – William Kidston
Premier of Tasmania – Sir Neil Elliott Lewis
Premier of Western Australia – Sir Newton Moore (until 16 September), then Frank Wilson
Premier of Victoria – John Murray

State governors
Governor of New South Wales – Frederic Thesiger, 3rd Baron Chelmsford
Governor of South Australia – Admiral Sir Day Bosanquet
Governor of Queensland – Sir William MacGregor
Governor of Tasmania – Major General Sir Harry Barron
Governor of Western Australia – Sir Gerald Strickland
Governor of Victoria – Sir Thomas Gibson-Carmichael

Events
 21 March – Harry Houdini achieves one of the first powered flights in Australia.
13 April – A referendum is held into alteration of the Australian Constitution regarding state debt and surplus revenue. The state debt question was carried, the surplus revenue question was not.
6 May – Edward VII dies, his son George V becomes King of the United Kingdom and the British Dominions.
 16 September – The Australian Treasury is given authority to issue currency, replacing the use of the British Pound.
16 November – The Northern Territory Acceptance Act 1910 receives Royal Assent from the Governor-General, transferring the Northern Territory from the control of South Australia to the Commonwealth.
19 November – A cyclone strikes the town of Broome, Western Australia, killing 40 people and destroying 20 houses.
25 November – The Royal Australian Navy is created with the passing of the Australian Naval Defence Act by the Federal Parliament. The destroyers HMAS Parramatta and HMAS Yarra arrive in Australia.
8 December – Geelong, Victoria is declared a city.
Founding of Employers Mutual Limited.

Science and technology

Dethridge wheel developed – used to measure flow of irrigation water delivered to farms

Arts and literature

Henry Handel Richardson's novel The Getting of Wisdom published

Sport
 Comedy King wins the Melbourne Cup
 South Australia wins the Sheffield Shield
The Great Britain rugby league team went on their first tour of Australasia and defeated Australia to win the Ashes.
17 September – The 1910 NSWRFL season culminates in a grand final between South Sydney and Newtown which is drawn 4 – 4. Newtown are crowned premiers by virtue of being minor premiers.

Births
11 January – Shane Paltridge (died 1966), politician
28 January – Jim Willis (died 1995), botanist
7 April – Alec Downer (died 1981), politician
10 April – Bob Marshall (died 2004), billiards champion
17 April – Ivan Goff (died 1999), screenwriter
2 May – Laurie Nash (died 1986), cricketer and footballer
11 May – John Béchervaise (died 1998), Antarctic explorer
6 July – John Knott (died 1999), public servant
16 July – Stan McCabe (died 1968), cricketer
22 July – Alan Moorehead (died 1983), war correspondent
22 August – Kenneth McIntyre (died 2004), historian and mathematician
28 August – Kathleen Best (died 1957), first director of the Women's Royal Australian Army Corps
28 August – Tom Burke (died 1973), politician
24 September – Douglas Darby (died 1985), politician
1 October – José Enrique Moyal, Palestinian-born mathematical physicist (died 1998)

Deaths

 4 January – Sir Frederick Darley, 6th Chief Justice of New South Wales (born in Ireland and died in the United Kingdom) (b. 1830)
 18 January – James Cuthbertson, poet and schoolteacher (born in the United Kingdom) (b. 1851)
 29 January – Sir Charles Todd, astronomer (born in the United Kingdom) (b. 1826)
 10 March – Sir Malcolm McEacharn, Victorian politician and shipping magnate (born in the United Kingdom and died in France) (b. 1852)
 15 March – Thomas Skene, Victorian politician (b. 1845)
 19 March – James Smith, journalist and encyclopedist (born in the United Kingdom) (b. 1820)
 3 April – Catherine Helen Spence, writer and suffragist (born in the United Kingdom) (b. 1825)
 25 April – Edward William O'Sullivan, New South Wales politician and journalist (b. 1846)
 27 May – George Britton Halford, anatomist and physiologist (born in the United Kingdom) (b. 1824)
 25 June – Field Flowers Goe, Anglican bishop (born and died in the United Kingdom) (b. 1832)
 7 July – Guglielmo Enrico Lardelli, composer (born in the United Kingdom) (b. 1857)
 20 July – Anderson Dawson, 14th Premier of Queensland (b. 1863)
 13 August - Micky Dore, rugby league and rugby union footballer (b. 1883)
 22 August – Joey Palmer, cricketer (b. 1859)
 26 August – Thomas Petrie, explorer, prospector and grazier (born in the United Kingdom) (b. 1831)
 30 August – George Throssell, 2nd Premier of Western Australia (born in Ireland) (b. 1840)
 23 September – Tup Scott, cricketer (b. 1858)
 14 November – Charles Gregory, cricketer (b. 1878)

See also
 List of Australian films of the 1910s

References

 
Australia
Years of the 20th century in Australia